Central Asmat is a Papuan language of West New Guinea, spoken by the Asmat people.

Dialects
Central Asmat has a number of dialects, which are:

 Keenok
 Sokoni
 Keenakap
 Kawenak (subdialects: Simai, Kainak, Mismam, Mecemup)

Yaosakor Asmat, assigned its own ISO code, is a variety of Central Asmat, not a distinct language.

References

Asmat-Kamoro languages
Languages of western New Guinea